Jahangir Shah Badsha (born 19 July 1949 in Kushtia) is a former Bangladeshi cricketer who played in 5 ODIs from 1986 to 1990. He is sometimes known on scoresheets by his nickname Badshah.

Shah made his debut in the national side in 1979, and until his retirement in 1990, he was the most reliable all-rounder of the side. He was team's most effective new ball bowler, and as a batsman he contributed in different positions, as a tail ender, as a night watchman and occasionally as an opener as well.

He was  one of the players who took part in Bangladesh's first ever official ODI (against Pakistan at Moratuwa in 1986). Though he was out for a duck, he took 2/23 from 9 overs.

Apart from being a successful cricketer, Shah was also a very competent footballer, and played for Abahani Krira Chakra until 1975.

ICC Trophy performances

Bowling style
He wasn't the fastest bowler in the world, but he had the ability to swing the new ball, especially away from the right-handers. Many still regard him as the best swing bowler Bangladesh ever had. Unfortunately, the conditions in Bangladesh, (and Indian subcontinent in general) are not very suitable for swing bowling. Not surprisingly, some of his best bowling efforts came abroad. For example, 4/17 against Canada in ICC Trophy (England) in 1979 and 4/39 against Malaysia in ICC Trophy (England) in 1986. No less impressive was his 1/7 from 10 overs (including 5 maidens) against Fiji in Bangladesh's first match in 79 ICC Trophy. His best bowling in home soil came in 1985, against the touring Lankans. He took 4/89- his victims included the Lankan openers Amal Silva & Sidath Wettimuny.

Family connection

Two of his brothers, Munna Shah and Nadir Shah also played international cricket. Nadir Shah was an international umpire. His cousin, Nazim Shirazi was considered the finest cricketing talent of the country in the early 80's. But after couple of seasons in international cricket, he went abroad to pursue his studies.

References

External links
 GROUND REALITIES | Our darkness at noon by Rafiqul Ameer

Bangladesh One Day International cricketers
Bangladeshi cricketers
Bangladeshi footballers
1949 births
Living people
Recipients of the Bangladesh National Sports Award
People from Kushtia District
Abahani Limited (Dhaka) players